Warangal Hyderabad Warangal push pull passenger, is an suburban service running between Warangal and Hyderabad in the Telangana state. The Secundrabad Division of South Central Railways of Indian Railways administers this train.

The train runs from Warangal to Hyderabad, the capital of Telangana state. 
 
It has daily two services between the Warangal to Hyderabad.

Numbers
The rake composition is 12 coach train with engines at both ends.

First Service Timings
67265 (Up) Warangal- Hyderabad Push-pull Passenger
67264 (Down) Hyderabad-Warangal Push-pull Passenger

Second Service Timings
67267 (Up) Warangal- Hyderabad Push-pull Passenger
67266 (Down) Hyderabad-Kazipet Push-pull Passenger

References

Rail transport in Telangana